Sparisoma aurofrenatum (common names: redband parrotfish, gutong, rainbow parrot, black parrot, and blisterside) is a species of parrotfish native to the Caribbean Sea and Western Atlantic Ocean.

Description
This species grows to 28 cm.

Initial phase
During the initial phase, the colouration varies greatly from blue-green to green to solid olive. The fins are mottled brown to red and have two white stripes. Behind the dorsal fin, a white spot is present.

Juvenile phase
The body of juvenile specimens are shades of red-brown. Normally, two white stripes will be visible with a black blotch present behind the upper gill covers. A white spot will also be present behind the dorsal fin.

During both the juvenile and initial phases, colouration and markings can change quickly.

Terminal phase
The body becomes greenish during the terminal phase. The underside will appear lighter and the anal fin becomes reddish. The tail becomes more square-shaped with black outer tips. The upper portion of the forebody will display a small, yellow blotch with at least two small black dots.

Normally, an orangish-pink colour band will be present starting from below the eye along to the corner of the mouth. A white spot will appear behind the dorsal fin.

Distribution
This species occurs throughout the Caribbean Sea, and the western Atlantic Ocean in the waters of Bermuda, Florida, the Bahamas to Central America and Brazil.

Habitat
Sparisoma aurofrenatum lives on reefs in depths of 2 to 20 metres. The juveniles live among seagrass beds.

Behaviour
Sparisoma aurofrenatum is solitary or found in small groups. It may found resting on the bottom.  It is a protogynous hermaphrodite.

While swimming about reefs, this fish will use only its pectoral fins. Only when requiring a sudden burst of speed will it use its tail.

Specimens may be seen defecating frequently, which appears as a white cloud as it is mostly composed of coral limestone.

Diet
Sparisoma aurofrenatum is a herbivore, feeding on algae and polyps it scrapes from rocks and coral using its 'beak'.

References

External links
 

aurofrenatum
Fish of the Atlantic Ocean
Fish of the Dominican Republic
Taxa named by Achille Valenciennes
Fish described in 1840